is a district of Minato, Tokyo, Japan. It was once home to grand estates of several , and now is one of Tokyo's most expensive upscale residential districts; it is home to many artists, CEOs, and celebrities.

Mita is bordered by Higashi-Azabu on the north, Azabu-Jūban and Minami-Azabu to the west, and Shirokane and Takanawa to the south. 

Mita is home to Keio University, Mita Hachiman Jinja, and the diplomatic missions of Kuwait, Italy, Hungary, Papua New Guinea, and Australia.

Geography
Mita consists of five chōme:

 Mita 1-chōme and 5-chōme are low lands by Furu River and consist of a mix of both residential and commercial areas.
Some of these estates remain to this day: the Tsunamachi Mitsui Club, Australian Embassy, and Italian Embassy are all on former Daimyo estates.
 Mita 3-chōme mostly consists of commercial buildings.
 Mita 4-chōme consists of many historic temples.

Economy

Transportation
As a historically quiet, upscale, residential area, Mita does not have any train or subway stations within its borders. However, it is located near: 
 Akabanebashi Station on the Toei Ōedo Line
 Azabu-juban Station on the Toei Ōedo Line and Tokyo Metro Namboku Line
 Mita Station on the Toei Mita Line and Toei Asakusa Line (Despite its name, Mita Station is not located in Mita, but in the neighboring Shiba district.)
 Shirokane-takanawa Station on the Tokyo Metro Namboku Line and Toei Mita Line
 Tamachi Station on the Yamanote Line and Keihin-Tōhoku Line

Notable places in Mita

Slopes
Many roads up to the Mita plateau have named slopes of historical significance. Each is marked by a wooden post which explains the name.

  corresponds to the ancient .

  is a hill road in Mita 4-chōme. It reaches the promontory from Gyoranzaka Crossing which results from the summit in Isaragozaka.

  (from ) is a hill road which lies between Takanawa 2-chōme and 3-chōme. Its name possibly originates from the fact that ivy and vines historically covered the surface of this hill, though an alternate etymology says that a Buddhist priest who wore a  died along this slope suddenly on a return trip from Shinagawa. 

  is a hill road which crosses between Takanawa 3-chōme and 4-chōme. The area has many hotels.

  (from ) is a slope which is in Mita 4-chōme.

  is a hill road crossing between Mita 3-chōme and 4-chōme. The temple of Anzenji was built here in the Edo era.

  is a hill road in Takanawa 3-chōme.

  is a hill road which forms the border of Shirokane 2-chōme and 4-chōme. The name originates from the Noh actor Hiyoshi Kahei who lived nearby.

Shinto shrines and temples
In the early stages of the Edo period, the  decided to extend Edo Castle and ordered temples around the castle to move to Mita. From this reason, there were many temples on the hill, especially in area named . Shrines in the district date back to the Asuka period or Heian period.

Parks

Today, some estates have been converted into public parks.
 
 .
 Children's park which exists in Mita 5-11-6 Minato, Tokyo, Japan.
 Area: 
 Nearby subway station: 
 Although a swing, sandbox, launching platform, box type swing, and drinking fountain once existed here, all except the drinking fountain have been removed.

Embassies
 Australian embassy
 Italian embassy

Universities
 Keio University

Tertiary schools
 Tokai University Junior College

Primary and secondary schools
Minato City Board of Education operates public elementary and junior high schools.

Mita 1–2 chōme are zoned to Akabane Elementary School (赤羽小学校), while Mita 3–5 chōme are zoned to Mita Elementary School (御田小学校). The entire district (1–5 chōme) is zoned to Mita Junior High School (三田中学校).

Full list of primary and secondary schools:
 
 
 
 Friends Girls Junior & Senior High School
 
 
 
 Laurus International School of Science Primary School

Public libraries
Minato City Library operates Mita Library in nearby Shiba.

See also

References

Districts of Minato, Tokyo